Dakha Assembly constituency (Sl. No.: 68) is a Punjab Legislative Assembly constituency in Ludhiana district, Punjab state, India. Until 2008, Dakha constituency was reserved for SC candidates. Since 2012 election it was opened to all candidates. Manpreet Singh Ayali is the MLA from Dakha since 2019.

Members of the Legislative Assembly

Election results

2022

By election 2019

2017

2012

Past elections

See also
 List of constituencies of the Punjab Legislative Assembly
 Ludhiana district

References

External links
  

Assembly constituencies of Punjab, India
Ludhiana district